The Cuban Revolution was a military and political effort to overthrow the government of Cuba between 1953 and 1959. It began after the 1952 Cuban coup d'état which placed Fulgencio Batista as head of state and the failed mass strike in opposition that followed. After failing to contest Batista in court, Fidel Castro organized an armed attack on the Cuban military's Moncada Barracks. The rebels were arrested and while in prison formed the 26th of July Movement. After gaining amnesty the M-26-7 rebels organized an expedition from Mexico on the Granma yacht to invade Cuba. In the following years the M-26-7 rebel army would slowly defeat the Cuban army in the countryside, while its urban wing would engage in sabotage and rebel army recruitment. Over time the originally critical and ambivalent Popular Socialist Party would come to support the 26th of July Movement in late 1958. By the time the rebels were to oust Batista the revolution was being driven by the Popular Socialist Party, 26th of July Movement, and the Directorio Revolucionario Estudiantil.

The 26th of July Movement later reformed along Marxist–Leninist lines, becoming the Communist Party of Cuba in October 1965.

The Cuban Revolution had powerful domestic and international repercussions. In particular, it transformed Cuba–United States relations, although efforts to improve diplomatic relations, such as the Cuban thaw, gained momentum during the 2010s. In the immediate aftermath of the revolution, Castro's government began a program of nationalization, centralization of the press and political consolidation that transformed Cuba's economy and civil society. The revolution also heralded an era of Cuban medical internationalism and Cuban intervention in foreign conflicts in Africa, Latin America, Southeast Asia, and the Middle East. Several rebellions occurred in the six years following 1959, mainly in the Escambray Mountains, which were defeated by the revolutionary government.

Background

Corruption in Cuba

The Republic of Cuba at the turn of the 20th century was largely characterized by a deeply ingrained tradition of corruption where political participation resulted in opportunities for elites to engage in wealth accumulation. Cuba's first presidential period under Don Tomás Estrada Palma from 1902 to 1906 was considered to uphold the best standards of administrative integrity in the history of the Republic of Cuba. However, a United States intervention in 1906 resulted in Charles Edward Magoon, an American diplomat, taking over the government until 1909. It has been debated whether Magoon's government condoned or in fact engaged in corrupt practices. Hugh Thomas suggests that while Magoon disapproved of corrupt practices, corruption still persisted under his administration and he undermined the autonomy of the judiciary and their court decisions. Cuba's subsequent president, José Miguel Gómez, was the first to become involved in pervasive corruption and government corruption scandals. These scandals involved bribes that were allegedly paid to Cuban officials and legislators under a contract to search the Havana harbour, as well as the payment of fees to government associates and high-level officials. Gómez's successor, Mario García Menocal, wanted to put an end to the corruption scandals and claimed to be committed to administrative integrity as he ran on a slogan of "honesty, peace and work". Despite his intentions, corruption actually intensified under his government from 1913–1921. Instances of fraud became more common while private actors and contractors frequently colluded with public officials and legislators. Charles Edward Chapman attributes the increase of corruption to the sugar boom that occurred in Cuba under the Menocal administration. Furthermore, the emergence of World War One enabled the Cuban government to manipulate sugar prices, the sales of exports and import permits.

Alfredo Zayas succeeded Menocal from 1921–1925 and engaged in what Calixto Maso refers to as the "maximum expression of administrative corruption". Both petty and grand corruption spread to nearly all aspects of public life and the Cuban administration became largely characterized by nepotism as Zayas relied on friends and relatives to illegally gain greater access to wealth. Due to Zaya's previous policies, Gerardo Machado aimed to diminish corruption and improve the public sector's performance under his successive administration from 1925 to 1933. While he was successfully able to reduce the amounts of low level and petty corruption, grand corruption still largely persisted. Machado embarked on development projects that enabled the persistence of grand corruption through inflated costs and the creation of "large margins" that enabled public officials to appropriate money illegally. Under his government, opportunities for corruption became concentrated into fewer hands with "centralized government purchasing procedures" and the collection of bribes among a smaller number of bureaucrats and administrators. Through the development of real estate infrastructures and the growth of Cuba's tourism industry, Machado's administration was able to use insider information to profit from private sector business deals.

Senator Eduardo Chibás dedicated himself to exposing corruption in the Cuban government, and formed the Partido Ortodoxo in 1947 to further this aim. Argote-Freyre points out that Cuba's population under the Republic had a high tolerance for corruption. Furthermore, Cubans knew and criticized who was corrupt, but admired them for their ability to act as "criminals with impunity". Corrupt officials went beyond members of congress to also include military officials who granted favours to residents and accepted bribes. The establishment of an illegal gambling network within the military enabled army personnel such as Lieutenant Colonel Pedraza and Major Mariné to engage in extensive illegal gambling activities. Mauricio Augusto Font and Alfonso Quiroz, authors of The Cuban Republic and José Martí, say that corruption pervaded in public life under the administrations of Presidents Ramón Grau and Carlos Prío Socarrás. Prío was reported to have stolen over $90 million in public funds, which was equivalent to one fourth of the annual national budget. Prior to the Communist revolution, Cuba was ruled under the elected government of Fulgencio Batista from 1940 to 1944. Throughout this time period, Batista's support base consisted mainly of corrupt politicians and military officials. Batista himself was able to heavily profit from the regime before coming into power through inflated government contracts and gambling proceeds. In 1942, the British Foreign Office reported that the U.S. State Department was "very worried" about corruption under President Fulgencio Batista, describing the problem as "endemic" and exceeding "anything which had gone on previously". British diplomats believed that corruption was rooted within Cuba's most powerful institutions, with the highest individuals in government and military being heavily involved in gambling and the drug trade. In terms of civil society, Eduardo Saenz Rovner writes that corruption within the police and government enabled the expansion of criminal organizations in Cuba. Batista refused U.S. President Franklin Roosevelt's offer to send experts to help reform the Cuban Civil Service.

Later in 1952, Batista led a military coup against Prío Socarras and ruled until 1959. Under his rule, Batista led a corrupt dictatorship that involved close links with organized crime organizations and the reduction of civil freedoms of Cubans. This period resulted in Batista engaging in more "sophisticated practices of corruption" at both the administrative and civil society levels. Batista and his administration engaged in profiteering from the lottery as well as illegal gambling. Corruption further flourished in civil society through increasing amounts of police corruption, censorship of the press as well as media, and creating anti-communist campaigns that suppressed opposition with violence, torture and public executions. The former culture of toleration and acceptance towards corruption also dissolved with the dictatorship of Batista. For instance, one citizen wrote that "however corrupt Grau and Prío were, we elected them and therefore allowed them to steal from us. Batista robs us without our permission." Corruption under Batista further expanded into the economic sector with alliances that he forged with foreign investors and the prevalence of illegal casinos and criminal organizations in the country's capital of Havana.

Batista regime

In the decades following the United States' invasion of Cuba in 1898, and formal independence from the U.S. on 20 May 1902, Cuba experienced a period of significant instability, enduring a number of revolts, coups and a period of U.S. military occupation. Fulgencio Batista, a former soldier who had served as the elected president of Cuba from 1940 to 1944, became president for the second time in 1952, after seizing power in a military coup and canceling the 1952 elections. Although Batista had been relatively progressive during his first term, in the 1950s he proved far more dictatorial and indifferent to popular concerns. While Cuba remained plagued by high unemployment and limited water infrastructure, Batista antagonized the population by forming lucrative links to organized crime and allowing American companies to dominate the Cuban economy, especially sugar-cane plantations and other local resources. Although the US armed and politically supported the Batista dictatorship, later US president John F. Kennedy recognized its corruption and the justifiability of removing it.

During his first term as president, Batista was supported by the original Communist Party of Cuba (later known as the Popular Socialist Party), but during his second term he became strongly anti-communist. Batista developed a rather weak security bridge as an attempt to silence political opponents. In the months following the March 1952 coup, Fidel Castro, then a young lawyer and activist, petitioned for the overthrow of Batista, whom he accused of corruption and tyranny. However, Castro's constitutional arguments were rejected by the Cuban courts. After deciding that the Cuban regime could not be replaced through legal means, Castro resolved to launch an armed revolution. To this end, he and his brother Raúl founded a paramilitary organization known as "The Movement", stockpiling weapons and recruiting around 1,200 followers from Havana's disgruntled working class by the end of 1952.

Early stages: 1953-1955

Attack on the Moncada Barracks 

Striking their first blow against the Batista government, Fidel and Raúl Castro gathered 70 fighters and planned a multi-pronged attack on several military installations. On 26 July 1953, the rebels attacked the Moncada Barracks in Santiago and the barracks in Bayamo, only to be decisively defeated by the far more numerous government soldiers. It was hoped that the staged attack would spark a nationwide revolt against Batista's government. After an hour of fighting most of the rebels and their leader fled to the mountains. The exact number of rebels killed in the battle is debatable; however, in his autobiography, Fidel Castro claimed that nine were killed in the fighting, and an additional 56 were executed after being captured by the Batista government. Due to the government's large number of men, Hunt revised the number to be around 60 members taking the opportunity to flee to the mountains along with Castro. Among the dead was Abel Santamaría, Castro's second-in-command, who was imprisoned, tortured, and executed on the same day as the attack.

Imprisonment and immigration 
Numerous key Movement revolutionaries, including the Castro brothers, were captured shortly afterwards. In a highly political trial, Fidel spoke for nearly four hours in his defense, ending with the words "Condemn me, it does not matter. History will absolve me." Castro's defense was based on nationalism, the representation and beneficial programs for the non-elite Cubans, and his patriotism and justice for the Cuban community. Fidel was sentenced to 15 years in the Presidio Modelo prison, located on Isla de Pinos, while Raúl was sentenced to 13 years. However, in 1955, under broad political pressure, the Batista government freed all political prisoners in Cuba, including the Moncada attackers. Fidel's Jesuit childhood teachers succeeded in persuading Batista to include Fidel and Raúl in the release.

Soon, the Castro brothers joined with other exiles in Mexico to prepare for the overthrow of Batista, receiving training from Alberto Bayo, a leader of Republican forces in the Spanish Civil War. In June 1955, Fidel met the Argentine revolutionary Ernesto "Che" Guevara, who joined his cause. Raúl and Fidel's chief advisor Ernesto aided the initiation of Batista's amnesty. The revolutionaries named themselves the "26th of July Movement", in reference to the date of their attack on the Moncada Barracks in 1953.

Student demonstrations 
By late 1955, student riots and demonstrations became more common, and unemployment became problematic as new graduates could not find jobs. These protests were dealt with increasing repression. All young people were seen as possible revolutionaries. Due to its continued opposition to the Cuban government and much protest activity taking place on its campus, the University of Havana was temporarily closed on 30 November 1956 (it did not reopen until 1959 under the first revolutionary government).

Attack on the Domingo Goicuria Barracks 
While the Castro brothers and the other 26 July Movement guerrillas were training in Mexico and preparing for their amphibious deployment to Cuba, another revolutionary group followed the example of the Moncada Barracks assault. On 29 April 1956 at 12:50 PM during Sunday mass, an independent guerrilla group of around 100 rebels led by Reynol Garcia attacked the Domingo Goicuria army barracks in Matanzas province. The attack was repelled with ten rebels and three soldiers killed in the fighting, and one rebel summarily executed by the garrison commander, Pilar Garcia. Florida International University historian Miguel A. Brito was in the nearby cathedral when the firefight began. He writes, "That day, the Cuban Revolution began for me and Matanzas."

Insurgency: 1956-1957

Granma landing 

The yacht Granma departed from Tuxpan, Veracruz, Mexico, on 25 November 1956, carrying the Castro brothers and 80 others including Ernesto "Che" Guevara and Camilo Cienfuegos, even though the yacht was only designed to accommodate 12 people with a maximum of 25. On 2 December, it landed in Playa Las Coloradas, in the municipality of Niquero, arriving two days later than planned because the boat was heavily loaded, unlike during the practice sailing runs. This dashed any hopes for a coordinated attack with the llano wing of the Movement. After arriving and exiting the ship, the band of rebels began to make their way into the Sierra Maestra mountains, a range in southeastern Cuba. Three days after the trek began, Batista's army attacked and killed most of the Granma participants – while the exact number is disputed, no more than twenty of the original eighty-two men survived the initial encounters with the Cuban army and escaped into the Sierra Maestra mountains.

The group of survivors included Fidel and Raúl Castro, Che Guevara and Camilo Cienfuegos. The dispersed survivors, alone or in small groups, wandered through the mountains, looking for each other. Eventually, the men would link up again – with the help of peasant sympathizers – and would form the core leadership of the guerrilla army. A number of female revolutionaries, including Celia Sanchez and Haydée Santamaría (the sister of Abel Santamaria), also assisted Fidel Castro's operations in the mountains.

Presidential palace attack 

On 13 March 1957, a separate group of revolutionaries – the anticommunist Student Revolutionary Directorate (RD) (Directorio Revolucionario Estudantil, DRE), composed mostly of students – stormed the Presidential Palace in Havana, attempting to assassinate Batista and overthrow the government. The attack ended in utter failure. The RD's leader, student José Antonio Echeverría, died in a shootout with Batista's forces at the Havana radio station he had seized to spread the news of Batista's anticipated death. The handful of survivors included Dr. Humberto Castello (who later became the Inspector General in the Escambray), Rolando Cubela and Faure Chomon (both later Comandantes of the 13 March Movement, centered in the Escambray Mountains of Las Villas Province).

The plan, as explained by Faure Chaumón Mediavilla, was to attack the Presidential Palace and occupy the radio station Radio Reloj at the Radiocentro CMQ Building in order to announce the death of Batista and call for a general strike. The Presidential Palace was to be captured by fifty men under the direction of Carlos Gutiérrez Menoyo and Faure Chomón, with support from a group of 100 armed men occupying the tallest buildings in the surrounding area of the Presidential Palace (La Tabacalera, the Sevilla Hotel, the Palace of Fine Arts). However this secondary support operation was not carried out, as the men failed to arrive at the scene due to last-minute hesitation. Although the attackers reached the third floor of the Palace, they did not locate or execute Batista.

Humboldt 7 massacre

The Humboldt 7 massacre occurred on 20 April 1957 at apartment 201 when the National Police led by Lt. Colonel Esteban Ventura Novo assassinated four participants who had survived the assault on the Presidential Palace and in the seizure of the Radio Reloj station at the Radiocentro CMQ Building.

Juan Pedro Carbó was sought by police for the assassination of Col. Antonio Blanco Rico, Chief of Batista's secret service. Marcos Rodríguez Alfonso (also known as "Marquitos") began arguing with Fructuoso, Carbó and Machadito; Joe Westbrook had not yet arrived. Marquitos, who gave the airs to be a revolutionary, was strongly against the revolution and was thus resented by the others. On the morning of 20 April 1957, Marquitos met with Lt. Colonel Esteban Ventura and revealed the location of where the young revolutionaries were, Humboldt 7. After 5:00 PM on 20 April, a large contingent of police officers arrived and assaulted apartment 201, where the four men were staying. The men were not aware that the police were outside. The police rounded up and executed the rebels, who were unarmed.

The incident was covered up until a post-revolution investigation in 1959. Marquitos was arrested and, after a double trial, was sentenced by the Supreme Court to the penalty of death by firing squad in March 1964.

Frank País

Frank Pais was a revolutionary organizer who had built an extensive urban network, who had been tried and acquitted for his role in organizing an unsuccessful uprising in Santiago de Cuba in support of Castro's landing. On 30 June 1957, Frank's younger brother, Josué Pais, was killed by the Santiago police. During the latter part of July 1957, a wave of systematic police searches forced Frank País into hiding in Santiago de Cuba. On 30 July he was in a safe house with Raúl Pujol, despite warnings from other members of the Movement that it was not secure. The Santiago police under Colonel José Salas Cañizares surrounded the building. Frank and Raúl attempted to escape. However, an informant betrayed them as they tried to walk to a waiting getaway car. The police officers drove the two men to the Callejón del Muro (Rampart Lane) and shot them in the back of the head. In defiance of Batista's regime, he was buried in the Santa Ifigenia Cemetery in the olive green uniform and red and black armband of 26 July Movement.

In response to the death of País, the workers of Santiago declared a spontaneous general strike. This strike was the largest popular demonstration in the city up to that point. The mobilization of 30 July 1957 is considered one of the most decisive dates in both the Cuban Revolution and the fall of Batista's dictatorship. This day has been instituted in Cuba as the Day of the Martyrs of the Revolution. The Frank País Second Front, the guerrilla unit led by Raúl Castro in the Sierra Maestra was named for the fallen revolutionary. His childhood home at 226 San Bartolomé Street was turned into The Santiago Frank País García House Museum and designated as a national monument. The international airport in Holguín, Cuba also bears his name.

Naval mutiny at Cienfuegos 
On 6 September 1957 elements of the Cuban navy in the Cienfuegos Naval Base staged a rising against the Batista regime. Led by junior officers in sympathy with the 26th of July Movement, this was originally intended to coincide with the seizure of warships in Havana harbour. Reportedly individual officials within the U.S. Embassy were aware of the plot and had promised U.S. recognition if it were successful.

By 5:30am the base was in the hands of the mutineers. Most of the 150 naval personnel sleeping at the base joined with the twenty-eight original conspirators, while eighteen officers were arrested. About two hundred 26th of July Movement members and other rebel supporters entered the base from the town and were given weapons. Cienfuegos was in rebel hands for several hours. 
By the afternoon Government motorised infantry had arrived from Santa Clara, supported by B-26 bombers. Armoured units followed from Havana. After street fighting throughout the afternoon and night the last of the rebels, holding out in the police headquarters, were overwhelmed. Approximately 70 mutineers and rebel supporters were executed and reprisals against civilians added to the estimated total death toll of 300 men.

The use of bombers and tanks recently provided under a US-Cuban arms agreement specifically for use in hemisphere defence, now raised tensions between the two governments.

Escalation and US involvement 
The United States supplied Cuba with planes, ships, tanks, and other technology such as napalm, which was used against the rebels. This would eventually come to an end due to a later arms embargo in 1958.

According to Tad Szulc, the United States began funding the 26th of July Movement around October or November 1957 and ending around middle 1958. "No less than $50,000" would be delivered to key leaders of the 26th of July Movement, the purpose being to instill sympathies to the United States amongst the rebels in case the movement succeeded.

While Batista increased troop deployments to the Sierra Maestra region to crush the 26 July guerrillas, the Second National Front of the Escambray kept battalions of the Constitutional Army tied up in the Escambray Mountains region. The Second National Front was led by former Revolutionary Directorate member Eloy Gutiérrez Menoyo and the "Comandante Yanqui" William Alexander Morgan. Gutiérrez Menoyo formed and headed the guerrilla band after news had broken out about Castro's landing in the Sierra Maestra, and José Antonio Echeverría had stormed the Havana Radio station. Though Morgan was dishonorably discharged from the U.S. Army, his recreating features from Army basic training made a critical difference in the Second National Front troops battle readiness.

Thereafter, the United States imposed an economic embargo on the Cuban government and recalled its ambassador, weakening the government's mandate further. Batista's support among Cubans began to fade, with former supporters either joining the revolutionaries or distancing themselves from Batista. Once Batista started making drastic decisions concerning Cuba's economy, he began to nationalize U.S oil refineries and other U.S properties. Nonetheless, the Mafia and U.S. businessmen maintained their support for the regime.

Batista's government often resorted to brutal methods to keep Cuba's cities under control. However, in the Sierra Maestra mountains, Castro, aided by Frank País, Ramos Latour, Huber Matos, and many others, staged successful attacks on small garrisons of Batista's troops. Castro was joined by CIA connected Frank Sturgis who offered to train Castro's troops in guerrilla warfare. Castro accepted the offer, but he also had an immediate need for guns and ammunition, so Sturgis became a gunrunner. Sturgis purchased boatloads of weapons and ammunition from CIA weapons expert Samuel Cummings' International Armament Corporation in Alexandria, Virginia. Sturgis opened a training camp in the Sierra Maestra mountains, where he taught Che Guevara and other 26 July Movement rebel soldiers guerrilla warfare.

In addition, poorly armed irregulars known as escopeteros harassed Batista's forces in the foothills and plains of Oriente Province. The escopeteros also provided direct military support to Castro's main forces by protecting supply lines and by sharing intelligence. Ultimately, the mountains came under Castro's control.

In addition to armed resistance, the rebels sought to use propaganda to their advantage. A pirate radio station called Radio Rebelde ("Rebel Radio") was set up in February 1958, allowing Castro and his forces to broadcast their message nationwide within enemy territory. Castro's affiliation with the New York Times journalist Herbert Matthews created a front page-worthy report on anti-communist propaganda. The radio broadcasts were made possible by Carlos Franqui, a previous acquaintance of Castro who subsequently became a Cuban exile in Puerto Rico.

During this time, Castro's forces remained quite small in numbers, sometimes fewer than 200 men, while the Cuban army and police force had a manpower of around 37,000. Even so, nearly every time the Cuban military fought against the revolutionaries, the army was forced to retreat. An arms embargo – imposed on the Cuban government by the United States on 14 March 1958 – contributed significantly to the weakness of Batista's forces. The Cuban air force rapidly deteriorated: it could not repair its airplanes without importing parts from the United States.

Final offensives: 1958-1959

Operation Verano 

Batista finally responded to Castro's efforts with an attack on the mountains called Operation Verano (Summer), known to the rebels as la Ofensiva. The army sent some 12,000 soldiers, half of them untrained recruits, into the mountains, along with his own brother Raul. In a series of small skirmishes, Castro's determined guerrillas defeated the Cuban army. In the Battle of La Plata, which lasted from 11 to 21 July 1958, Castro's forces defeated a 500-man battalion, capturing 240 men while losing just three of their own.

However, the tide nearly turned on 29 July 1958, when Batista's troops almost destroyed Castro's small army of some 300 men at the Battle of Las Mercedes. With his forces pinned down by superior numbers, Castro asked for, and received, a temporary cease-fire on 1 August. Over the next seven days, while fruitless negotiations took place, Castro's forces gradually escaped from the trap. By 8 August, Castro's entire army had escaped back into the mountains, and Operation Verano had effectively ended in failure for the Batista government.

Battle of Las Mercedes

The Battle of Las Mercedes (29 July-8 August 1958) was the last battle of Operation Verano. The battle was a trap, designed by Cuban General Eulogio Cantillo to lure Fidel Castro's guerrillas into a place where they could be surrounded and destroyed. The battle ended with a cease-fire which Castro proposed and which Cantillo accepted. During the cease-fire, Castro's forces escaped back into the hills. The battle, though technically a victory for the Cuban army, left the army dispirited and demoralized. Castro viewed the result as a victory and soon launched his own offensive.

Battalion 17 began its pull back on 29 July 1958. Castro sent a column of men under René Ramos Latour to ambush the retreating soldiers. They attacked the advance guard and killed some 30 soldiers but then came under attack from previously undetected Cuban forces. Latour called for help and Castro came to the battle scene with his own column of men. Castro's column also came under fire from another group of Cuban soldiers that had secretly advanced up the road from the Estrada Palma Sugar Mill.

As the battle heated up, General Cantillo called up more forces from nearby towns and some 1,500 troops started heading towards the fighting. However, this force was halted by a column under Che Guevara's command. While some critics accuse Che for not coming to the aid of Latour, Major Bockman argues that Che's move here was the correct thing to do. Indeed, he called Che's tactical appreciation of the battle "brilliant".

By the end of July, Castro's troops were fully engaged and in danger of being wiped out by the vastly superior numbers of the Cuban army. He had lost 70 men, including René Latour, and both he and the remains of Latour's column were surrounded. The next day, Castro requested a cease-fire with General Cantillo, even offering to negotiate an end to the war. This offer was accepted by General Cantillo for reasons that remain unclear.

Batista sent a personal representative to negotiate with Castro on 2 August. The negotiations yielded no result but during the next six nights, Castro's troops managed to slip away unnoticed. On 8 August when the Cuban army resumed its attack, they found no one to fight.

Castro's remaining forces had escaped back into the mountains, and Operation Verano had effectively ended in failure for the Batista government.

Battle of Yaguajay

In 1958, Fidel Castro ordered his revolutionary army to go on the offensive against Batista's army. While Castro led one force against Guisa, Masó and other towns, another major offensive was directed at the capture of the city of Santa Clara, the capital of what was then Las Villas Province.

Three columns were sent against Santa Clara under the command of Che Guevara, Jaime Vega, and Camilo Cienfuegos. Vega's column was caught in an ambush and completely destroyed. Guevara's column took up positions around Santa Clara (near Fomento). Cienfuegos's column directly attacked a local army garrison at Yaguajay. Initially numbering just 60 men out of Castro's hardened core of 230, Cienfuegos's group had gained many recruits as it crossed the countryside towards Santa Clara, eventually reaching an estimated strength of 450 to 500 fighters.

The garrison consisted of some 250 men under the command of a Cuban captain of Chinese ancestry, Alfredo Abon Lee. The attack seems to have started around 19 December.

Convinced that reinforcements would be sent from Santa Clara, Lee put up a determined defense of his post. The guerrillas repeatedly attempted to overpower Lee and his men, but failed each time. By 26 December Camilo Cienfuegos had become quite frustrated; it seemed that Lee could not be overpowered, nor could he be convinced to surrender. In desperation, Cienfuegos tried using a homemade tank against Lee's position. The "tank" was actually a large tractor encased in iron plates with attached makeshift flamethrowers on top. It, too, proved unsuccessful.

Finally, on 30 December Lee ran out of ammunition and was forced to surrender his force to the guerrillas. The surrender of the garrison was a major blow to the defenders of the provincial capital of Santa Clara. The next day, the combined forces of Cienfuegos, Guevara, and local revolutionaries under William Alexander Morgan captured the city in a fight of vast confusion. Panicked by news of the defeat at Santa Clara and other losses, Batista fled Cuba the next day.

Battle of Guisa

On the morning of 20 November 1958, a convoy of the Batista soldiers began its usual journey from Guisa. Shortly after leaving that town, located in the northern foothills of the Sierra Maestra, the rebels attacked the caravan.

Guisa was 12 kilometers from the Command Post of the Zone of Operations, located on the outskirts of the city of Bayamo. Nine days earlier, Fidel Castro had left the La Plata Command, beginning an unstoppable march east with his escort and a small group of combatants.

On 19 November, the rebels arrived in Santa Barbara. By that time, there were approximately 230 combatants. Fidel gathered his officers to organize the siege of Guisa, and ordered the placement of a mine on the Monjarás bridge, over the Cupeinicú river. That night the combatants made a camp in Hoyo de Pipa. In the early morning, they took the path that runs between the Heliografo hill and the Mateo Roblejo hill, where they occupied strategic positions. In the meeting on the 20th, the army lost a truck, a bus, and a jeep. Six were killed and 17 prisoners were taken, three of them wounded. At around 10:30 am, the military Command Post located in the Zone of Operations in Bayamo sent a reinforcement made up of Co. 32, plus a platoon from Co. L and another platoon from Co. 22. This force was unable to advance for the resistance of the rebels. Fidel ordered the mining of another bridge over a tributary of the Cupeinicú River. Hours later the army sent a platoon from Co. 82 and another platoon from Co. 93, supported by a T-17 tank.

Rebel offensive

On 21 August 1958, after the defeat of Batista's Ofensiva, Castro's forces began their own offensive. In the Oriente province (in the area of the present-day provinces of Santiago de Cuba, Granma, Guantánamo and Holguín), Fidel Castro, Raúl Castro and Juan Almeida Bosque directed attacks on four fronts. Descending from the mountains with new weapons captured during the Ofensiva and smuggled in by plane, Castro's forces won a series of initial victories. Castro's major victory at Guisa, and the successful capture of several towns including Maffo, Contramaestre, and Central Oriente, brought the Cauto plains under his control.

Meanwhile, three rebel columns, under the command of Che Guevara, Camilo Cienfuegos and Jaime Vega, proceeded westward toward Santa Clara, the capital of Villa Clara Province. Batista's forces ambushed and destroyed Jaime Vega's column, but the surviving two columns reached the central provinces, where they joined forces with several other resistance groups not under the command of Castro. When Che Guevara's column passed through the province of Las Villas, and specifically through the Escambray Mountains – where the anticommunist Revolutionary Directorate forces (who became known as the 13 March Movement) had been fighting Batista's army for many months – friction developed between the two groups of rebels. Nonetheless, the combined rebel army continued the offensive, and Cienfuegos won a key victory in the Battle of Yaguajay on 30 December 1958, earning him the nickname "The Hero of Yaguajay".

1958 Cuban general election

General elections were held in Cuba on 3 November 1958. The three major presidential candidates were Carlos Márquez Sterling of the Partido del Pueblo Libre, Ramón Grau of the Partido Auténtico and Andrés Rivero Agüero of the Coalición Progresista Nacional. There was also a minor party candidate on the ballot, Alberto Salas Amaro for the Union Cubana party. Voter turnout was estimated at about 50% of eligible voters. Although Andrés Rivero Agüero won the presidential election with 70% of the vote, he was unable to take office due to the Cuban Revolution.

Rivero Agüero was due to be sworn in on 24 February 1959. In a conversation between him and the American ambassador Earl E. T. Smith on 15 November 1958, he called Castro a "sick man" and stated it would be impossible to reach a settlement with him. Rivero Agüero also said that he planned to restore constitutional government and would convene a Constitutional Assembly after taking office.

This was the last competitive election in Cuba, the 1940 Constitution of Cuba, the Congress and the Senate of the Cuban Republic, were quickly dismantled shortly thereafter.
The rebels had publicly called for an election boycott, issuing its Total War Manifesto on 12 March 1958, threatening to kill anyone that voted.

Battle of Santa Clara and Batista's flight 

On 31 December 1958, the Battle of Santa Clara took place in a scene of great confusion. The city of Santa Clara fell to the combined forces of Che Guevara, Cienfuegos, and Revolutionary Directorate (RD) rebels led by Comandantes Rolando Cubela, Juan ("El Mejicano") Abrahantes, and William Alexander Morgan. News of these defeats caused Batista to panic. He fled Cuba by air for the Dominican Republic just hours later on 1 January 1959. Comandante William Alexander Morgan, leading RD rebel forces, continued fighting as Batista departed and had captured the city of Cienfuegos by 2 January.

Cuban General Eulogio Cantillo entered Havana's Presidential Palace, proclaimed the Supreme Court judge Carlos Piedra as the new president, and began appointing new members to Batista's old government.

Castro learned of Batista's flight in the morning and immediately started negotiations to take over Santiago de Cuba. On 2 January, the military commander in the city, Colonel Rubido, ordered his soldiers not to fight, and Castro's forces took over the city. The forces of Guevara and Cienfuegos entered Havana at about the same time. They had met no opposition on their journey from Santa Clara to Cuba's capital. Castro himself arrived in Havana on 8 January after a long victory march. His initial choice of president, Manuel Urrutia Lleó, took office on 3 January.

Aftermath

Presidency of Manuel Urrutia Lleó

 
Manuel Urrutia Lleó (8 December 1901 – 5 July 1981) was a liberal Cuban lawyer and politician. He campaigned against the Gerardo Machado government and the second presidency of Fulgencio Batista during the 1950s, before serving as president in the first revolutionary government of 1959. Urrutia resigned his position after seven months, owing to a series of disputes with revolutionary leader Fidel Castro, and emigrated to the United States shortly afterward.

The Cuban Revolution gained victory on 1 January 1959, and Urrutia returned from exile in Venezuela to take up residence in the presidential palace. His new revolutionary government consisted largely of Cuban political veterans and pro-business liberals including José Miró, who was appointed as prime minister.

Once in power, Urrutia swiftly began a program of closing all brothels, gambling outlets and the national lottery, arguing that these had long been a corrupting influence on the state. The measures drew immediate resistance from the large associated workforce. The disapproving Castro, then commander of Cuba's new armed forces, intervened to request a stay of execution until alternative employment could be found.

Disagreements also arose in the new government concerning pay cuts, which were imposed on all public officials on Castro's demand. The disputed cuts included a reduction of the $100,000  a year presidential salary Urrutia had inherited from Batista. By February, following the surprise resignation of Miró, Castro had assumed the role of prime minister; this strengthened his power and rendered Urrutia increasingly a figurehead president. As Urrutia's participation in the legislative process declined, other unresolved disputes between the two leaders continued to fester. His belief in the restoration of elections was rejected by Castro, who felt that they would usher in a return to the old discredited system of corrupt parties and fraudulent balloting that had marked the Batista era.

Urrutia was then accused by the Avance newspaper of buying a luxury villa, which was portrayed as a frivolous betrayal of the revolution and led to an outcry from the general public. He denied the allegation issuing a writ against the newspaper in response. The story further increased tensions between the various factions in the government, though Urrutia asserted publicly that he had "absolutely no disagreements" with Fidel Castro. Urrutia attempted to distance the Cuban government (including Castro) from the growing influence of the communists within the administration, making a series of critical public comments against the latter group. Whilst Castro had not openly declared any affiliation with the Cuban communists, Urrutia had been a declared anti-communist since they had refused to support the insurrection against Batista, stating in an interview, "If the Cuban people had heeded those words, we would still have Batista with us ... and all those other war criminals who are now running away".

Relations with the United States

 
The Cuban Revolution was a crucial turning point in U.S.-Cuban relations. Although the United States government was initially willing to recognize Castro's new government, it soon came to fear that Communist insurgencies would spread through the nations of Latin America, as they had in Southeast Asia. Meanwhile, Castro's government resented the Americans for providing aid to Batista's government during the revolution. After the revolutionary government nationalized all U.S. property in Cuba in August 1960, the American Eisenhower administration froze all Cuban assets on American soil, severed diplomatic ties and tightened its embargo of Cuba. The Key West–Havana ferry shut down. In 1961, the U.S. government launched the Bay of Pigs Invasion, in which Brigade 2506 (a CIA-trained force of 1,500 soldiers, mostly Cuban exiles) landed on a mission to oust Castro; the attempt to overthrow Castro failed, with the invasion being repulsed by the Cuban military. The U.S. embargo against Cuba is still in force as of 2020, although it underwent a partial loosening during the Obama Administration, only to be strengthened in 2017 under Trump. The U.S. began efforts to normalize relations with Cuba in the mid-2010s, and formally reopened its embassy in Havana after over half a century in August 2015. The Trump administration reversed much of the Cuban Thaw by severely restricting travel by US citizens to Cuba and tightening the US government's embargo against the country.

Relations with the Soviet Union

Following the American embargo, the Soviet Union became Cuba's main ally. The Soviet Union did not initially want anything to do with Cuba or Latin America until the United States had taken an interest in dismantling Castro's communist government. At first, many people in the Soviet Union did not know anything about Cuba, and those that did saw Castro as a "troublemaker" and the Cuba Revolution as "one big heresy". There were three big reasons why the Soviet Union changed their attitudes and finally took interest in the island country. First was the success of the Cuban Revolution, to which Moscow responded with great interest as they understood that if a communist revolution was successful for Cuba, it could be successful elsewhere in Latin America. So from then on the Soviets began looking into foreign affairs in Latin America. Second, after learning about the United States' aggressive plan to deploy another Guatemala scenario in Cuba, the Soviet opinion quickly changed feet. Third, Soviet leaders saw the Cuban Revolution as first and foremost an anti–North American revolution which of course whet their appetite as this was during the height of the cold war and the Soviet, US battle for global dominance was at its apex.

The Soviets' attitude of optimism changed to one of concern for the safety of Cuba after it was excluded from the inter-American system at the conference held at Punta del Este in January 1962 by the Organization of American States. This coupled with the threat of a United States invasion of the island was really the turning point for Soviet Concern, the idea was that should Cuba be defeated by the United States it would mean defeat for the Soviet Union and for Marxism–Leninism. If Cuba were to fall, "other Latin American countries would reject us, claiming that for all our might the Soviet Union had not been able to do anything for Cuba except to make empty protests to the United Nations" wrote Khrushchev. The Soviet attitude towards Cuba changed to concern for the safety of the island nation because of increased US tensions and threats of invasion making the Soviet–Cuban relationship superficial insofar as it only cared about denying the US power in the region and maintaining Soviet supremacy. All of these events lead up to the two Communist countries quickly developing close military and intelligence ties, which culminated in the stationing of Soviet nuclear weapons in Cuba in 1962, an act which triggered the Cuban Missile Crisis in October 1962.

The aftermath of the Cuban Missile Crisis saw embarrassment for the Soviet Union, and many countries including Soviet countries were quick to criticize Moscow's handling of the situation. In a letter that Khrushchev writes to Castro in January of the following year (1963), after the end of conflict, he talks about wanting to discuss the issues in the two countries' relations. He writes attacking voices from other countries, including socialist ones, blaming the USSR of being opportunistic and self-serving. He explained the decision to withdraw missiles from Cuba, stressing the possibility of advancing Communism through peaceful means. Khrushchev underlined the importance of guaranteeing against an American attack on Cuba and urged Havana to focus on economic, cultural, and technological development to become a shining beacon of socialism in Latin America. In closing he invites Fidel Castro to visit Moscow and discuss the preparations for such a trip.

The following two decades in the 1970s and 1980s were somewhat of an enigma in the sense that the 1970s and 1980s were filled with the most prosperity in Cuba's history, yet the revolutionary government hit full stride in achieving its most organized form, and it adopted and enacted several brutal features of socialist regimes from the Eastern Bloc. Despite this it seems to be a time of prosperity. In 1972 Cuba joined COMECON, officially joining their trade with the Soviet Union's socialist trade bloc. That along with increased Soviet subsidies, better trade terms, and better, more practical domestic policy led to several years of prosperous growth. This period also sees Cuba strengthening its foreign policy with other communistic anti-US imperial countries like Nicaragua. This period is marked as the Sovietization of the 1970s and 1980s.

Cuba maintained close links to the Soviets until the Soviet Union's collapse in 1991. The end of Soviet economic aid and the loss of its trade partners in the Eastern Bloc led to an economic crisis and period of shortages known as the Special Period in Cuba.

Current day relations with Russia, formerly the Soviet Union, ended in 2002 after the Russian Federation closed an intelligence base in Cuba over budgetary concerns. However, in the last decade, relations have increased in recent years after Russia faced international backlash from the West over the situation in Ukraine in 2014. In retaliation for NATO expansion towards the east, Russia has sought to create these same agreements in Latin America. Russia has specifically sought greater ties with Cuba, Nicaragua, Venezuela, Brazil, and Mexico. Currently, these countries maintain close economic ties with the United States. In 2012, Putin decided that Russia focus its military power in Cuba like it had in the past. Putin is quoted saying "Our goal is to expand Russia's presence on the global arms and military equipment market. This means expanding the number of countries we sell to and expanding the range of goods and services we offer."

Global influence

Castro's victory and post-revolutionary foreign policy had global repercussions as influenced by the expansion of the Soviet Union into Eastern Europe after the 1917 October Revolution. In line with his call for revolution in Latin America and beyond against imperial powers, laid out in his Declarations of Havana, Castro immediately sought to "export" his revolution to other countries in the Caribbean and beyond, sending weapons to Algerian rebels as early as 1960. In the following decades, Cuba became heavily involved in supporting Communist insurgencies and independence movements in many developing countries, sending military aid to insurgents in Ghana, Nicaragua, Yemen, and Angola, among others. Castro's intervention in the Angolan Civil War in the 1970s and 1980s was particularly significant, involving as many as 60,000 Cuban soldiers.

Characteristics

Ideology

At the time of the revolution various sectors of society supported the revolutionary movement from communists to business leaders and the Catholic Church.

The beliefs of Fidel Castro during the revolution have been the subject of much historical debate. Fidel Castro was openly ambiguous about his beliefs at the time. Some orthodox historians argue Castro was a communist from the beginning with a long-term plan; however, others have argued he had no strong ideological loyalties. Leslie Dewart has stated that there is no evidence to suggest Castro was ever a communist agent. Levine and Papasotiriou believe Castro believed in little outside of a distaste for American imperialism. As evidence for his lack of communist leanings they note his friendly relations with the United States shortly after the revolution and him not joining the Cuban Communist Party during the beginning of his land reforms.

At the time of the revolution the 26th of July Movement involved people of various political persuasions, but most were in agreement and desired the reinstatement of the 1940 Constitution of Cuba and supported the ideals of Jose Marti. Che Guevara commented to Jorge Masetti in an interview during the revolution that "Fidel isn't a communist" also stating "politically you can define Fidel and his movement as 'revolutionary nationalist'. Of course he is anti-American, in the sense that Americans are anti-revolutionaries".

Women's roles

The importance of women's contributions to the Cuban Revolution is reflected in the very accomplishments that allowed the revolution to be successful, from the participation in the Moncada Barracks, to the Mariana Grajales all-women's platoon that served as Fidel Castro's personal security detail. Tete Puebla, second in command of the Mariana Grajales Women's Platoon, has said:

Before the Mariana Grajales Platoon was established, the revolutionary women of the Sierra Maestra were not organized for combat and primarily helped with cooking, mending clothes, and tending to the sick, frequently acting as couriers, as well as teaching guerrillas to read and write.
Haydée Santamaría and Melba Hernandez were the only women who participated in the attack on the Moncada Barracks, afterward acting alongside Natalia Revuelta, and Lidia Castro (Fidel Castro's sister) to form alliances with anti-Batista organizations, as well as the assembly and distribution of "History Will Absolve Me". Celia Sanchez and Vilma Espin were leading strategists and highly skilled combatants who held essential roles throughout the revolution. Tete Puebla, founding member and second in command of the Mariana Grajales Platoon, said of Celia Sanchez, "When you speak of Celia, you've got to speak of Fidel, and vice versa. Celia's ideas touched almost everything in the Sierra."

Related archival collections 
There were many foreign presences in Cuba during this time. Esther Brinch was a Danish translator for the Danish government in 1960's Cuba. Brinch's work covered the Cuban Revolution and Cuban Missile Crisis. A collection of Brinch's archival materials is housed at the George Mason University Special Collections Research Center.

See also

 Communist revolution
 Communism
 Cuban thaw
 History of Cuba
 Latin American wars of independence
 Corruption in Cuba
 Consolidation of the Cuban Revolution
 Foreign relations of Cuba

Notes

References

Bibliography

Further reading
 Thomas M. Leonard (1999). Castro and the Cuban Revolution. Greenwood Press. .
 Julio García Luis (2008). Cuban Revolution Reader: A Documentary History of Key Moments in Fidel Castro's Revolution. Ocean Press. .
 Samuel Farber (2012). Cuba Since the Revolution of 1959: A Critical Assessment. Haymarket Books. .
 Joseph Hansen (1994). Dynamics of the Cuban Revolution: A Marxist Appreciation. Pathfinder Press. .
 Julia E. Sweig (2004). Inside the Cuban Revolution: Fidel Castro and the Urban Underground. Harvard University Press. .
 Thomas C. Wright (2000). Latin America in the Era of the Cuban Revolution. Praeger Paperback. .
 Marifeli Perez-Stable (1998). The Cuban Revolution: Origins, Course, and Legacy. Oxford University Press. .
 Geraldine Lievesley (2004). The Cuban Revolution: Past, Present and Future Perspectives. Palgrave Macmillan. .
 Teo A. Babun (2005). The Cuban Revolution: Years of Promise. University Press of Florida. .
 Antonio Rafael de la Cova (2007). The Moncada Attack: Birth of the Cuban Revolution. University of South Carolina Press. .
 Samuel Farber (2006). The Origins of the Cuban Revolution Reconsidered. The University of North Carolina Press. .
 Jules R. Benjamin (1992). The United States and the Origins of the Cuban Revolution. Princeton University Press. .
 Comite central del Partido comunista de Cuba: Comisión de orientación revolucionaria (1972). Rencontre symbolique entre deux processus historiques [i.e., de Cuba et de Chile]. La Habana, Cuba: Éditions politiques.
 David M. Watry (2014). Diplomacy at the Brink: Eisenhower, Churchill, and Eden in the Cold War. Baton Rouge: Louisiana State University Press. .
 Dolgoff, Sam The Cuban Revolution, a Critical Perspective The Cuban Revolution Table of Contents

External links
 Fidel Castro. . The Nation via Internet Archive. 30 November 1957.
 "The Cuban Revolution (1952–1958)". Latin American Studies Organization.
 Michael Voss. "Reliving Cuba's Revolution". BBC. 29 December 2008.
 "The History of Socialist Revolution in Cuba (1953–1959)". World History Archives.
 Arthur Brice. "Memories of Boyhood in the Heat of the Cuban Revolution". CNN. 2009.
 "1959–2009: Celebrating 50 years of the Cuban Revolution". Cuba Solidarity Campaign.
 .
 Rodríguez, Silvio. "Silvio Rodríguez Sings of the Special Period." In The Cuba Reader: History, Culture, Politics, 521–524.
 Rionda, Salvador. "Sugar Mills and Soviets." In The Cuba Reader: History, Culture, Politics, 259–260.
Shutterbulky. "Cuban Revolution – Completely Analytical Digest" shutterbulky web article: 22 July 2021

 
Revolution
Revolution
Revolution
20th-century revolutions
Anti-Americanism
Che Guevara
Cold War
Communist revolutions
History of socialism
Cuba–United States relations
Cuba–Russia relations
China–Cuba relations
Fidel Castro
United States–Caribbean relations
1950s conflicts
Proxy wars
Republic of Cuba (1902–1959)